Nigel Boocock (17 September 1937 – 3 April 2015) was a British speedway rider who appeared in eight Speedway World Championship finals and was a reserve in one other (1962).

Career
Born in Wakefield, England, Boocock started his career with the Bradford Tudors in 1955 and stayed there until 1957, followed by spells with the Birmingham Brummies and the Ipswich Witches, before moving in 1959 to the Coventry Bees. He spent the next eighteen seasons with the Bees, winning the British League Championship in 1968.

Boocock was the first English rider to win the prestigious FIM Internationale meeting held at Wimbledon. He was known for the blue leathers he raced in when most other riders wore black leathers – he was nicknamed "Little Boy Blue". He appeared with brother Eric Boocock in the 1970 Speedway World Pairs Championship finals, finishing in third place. He was also a regular England International rider and captain of the National team for many years.

Personal life
Boocock married Cynthia Boon in 1958, and they had three children, Victoria, Darren and Mandy. He and Cynthia retired to Australia, which he had visited on numerous occasions with British Lions and England teams during the English winter months. For some time they lived in Maroubra (Sydney), NSW; and Darren and Mandy attended Maroubra Bay Public School.

In 2006, Boocock, who continued to support junior speedway and speedway in general, joined former World Champion Ivan Mauger, and other guests such as South Australian speedway legends John Boulger and Bill Wigzell, Australian flagman Glen Dix, and former Rowley Park Speedway (Adelaide, South Australia) promoter Kym Bonython for the official opening of a junior speedway track on the infield of one of Australia's premier motorcycle speedways, the Gillman Speedway in Adelaide. Bonython officially opened the 111-metre-long track, with Boocock and Boulger acting as starting marshals for the night.

In 2008 his son Darren Boocock, a former rider and Coventry Bees mascot, and his wife Sharon were killed in a road accident in Yorkshire. His and Cynthia's children each had at least one child - Jack, Daniel, Carl, Thomas and Liam

Nigel Boocock died on 3 April 2015, aged 77.

World final appearances

Individual World Championship
 1956 -  London, Wembley Stadium - Reserve, did not ride
 1962 -  London, Wembley Stadium - Reserve, did not ride
 1963 -  London, Wembley Stadium - 7th - 8pts
 1964 -  Göteborg, Ullevi - 9th - 6pts
 1965 -  London, Wembley Stadium - 8th - 8pts
 1966 -  Göteborg, Ullevi - 15th - 2pt
 1968 -  Göteborg, Ullevi - 16th - 1pt
 1969 -  London, Wembley Stadium - 4th - 10pts
 1971 -  Göteborg, Ullevi - 9th - 6pts
 1972 -  London, Wembley Stadium - 10th - 6pts

World Pairs Championship
 1969*-  Stockholm, Gubbängens IP (with Martin Ashby) - 3rd - 21pts (11)
 1970 -  Malmö, Malmö Stadion (with Eric Boocock) - 3rd - 19pts (6)
* Unofficial World Championships.

World Team Cup
 1960*-  Göteborg, Ullevi (with Peter Craven / Ron How / Ken McKinlay / George White) - 2nd - 30pts (1)
 1964 -  Abensberg, Abensberg Stadion (with Barry Briggs / Ron How / Ken McKinlay / Brian Brett) - 3rd - 21pts (3)
 1965 -  Kempten (with Barry Briggs / Charlie Monk / Ken McKinlay / Jimmy Gooch) - 3rd - 18pts (6)
 1966 -  Wrocław, Olympic Stadium (with Barry Briggs / Terry Betts / Ivan Mauger / Colin Pratt) - 4th - 8pts (4)
 1968 -  London, Wembley Stadium (with Ivan Mauger / Barry Briggs / Martin Ashby / Norman Hunter) - Winner - 40pts (10)
 1969 -  Rybnik, Rybnik Municipal Stadium (with Martin Ashby / Ivan Mauger / Barry Briggs) - 2nd - 27pts (5)
 1970 -  London, Wembley Stadium  (with Ivan Mauger / Barry Briggs / Eric Boocock / Ray Wilson) - 2nd - 31pts (2)
* 1960 for England. All others for Great Britain.

References

1937 births
2015 deaths
Sportspeople from Wakefield
British speedway riders
English motorcycle racers
Speedway promoters
Coventry Bees riders
Exeter Falcons riders
Canterbury Crusaders riders
Birmingham Brummies riders
Bradford Tudors riders
Bristol Bulldogs riders
Ipswich Witches riders
Swindon Robins riders